The Gulf of Zula, also known as Annesley Bay, Baia di Arafali or Zula Bahir Selat’ē, is a body of water on the Eritrean coastline on the Red Sea.

Geography
It is located between the Foro Subregion and the Buri Peninsula of the Ghela'elo Subregion, both in the country's Northern Red Sea region. On the west side of the gulf are two large mountains, Jebel Gedem  and Mount Arbalu . Between the two, the Aligede River flows, with the village of Zula on its right bank. The coast of the gulf is fringed with mangroves on either side of the mouth of the river. The egyptologist Henry Salt identified Zula as the ancient archaeological site of Adulis.

Near the head of the gulf is the village of Arafali, beside the extinct Dola Volcano . From here, several roads radiate into the surrounding areas. To the east of the gulf lies the Buri Peninsula. This generally low-lying, undulating area is composed of lava flows at the southern end and granite at the north. Fringing reefs border much of this coast. About  beyond Arafali is Dolphin Cove, with a low, flat beach, backed by a steep rise to Mount Abdur  behind.  further on is the narrow Melita Bay with the village of Macanille at its head. Here there are coastal reefs and mangrove swamps.

The Gulf of Zula is a deep water bay, formed as part of the complex rifting system that occurred in these parts where three tectonic plates meet. The gulf also marks the territorial division between the Saho people and the Afar people.

References
 

Zula
Northern Red Sea Region